Raznochinovka is a rural locality (a selo) and the administrative center of Raznochinovsky Selsoviet, Narimanovsky District, Astrakhan Oblast, Russia. The population was 1,632 as of 2010. There are 33  streets.

Geography 
Raznochinovka is located on the Volga River, 91 km southeast of Narimanov (the district's administrative centre) by road. Volzhskoye is the nearest rural locality.

References 

Rural localities in Narimanovsky District